The 2017 TAC Cup Girls season was the inaugural season of the TAC Cup Girls competition for under-18 female Australian rules footballers in Victoria. The premiership was won by the Calder Cannons, who finished on top of the ladder with the highest percentage at the end of season. This was the mechanism to determine the premiers, with no finals series or Grand Final match held as is customary in Australian football competitions.

Ladder

References

NAB League
NAB League Girls
Nab League Girls